Until 1 January 2007 Them municipality was a municipality (Danish, kommune) in the former Aarhus County on the Jutland peninsula in central Denmark.  The municipality covered an area of 210 km2, and had a total population of 7,000 (2005).  Its last mayor was Torben Hansen, a member of the Socialist People's Party (Socialistisk Folkeparti) political party. The main town and the site of its municipal council was the town of Them.

 Bryrup Parish
 Them Parish
 Vinding Parish
 Vrads Parish

Them municipality ceased to exist as the result of Kommunalreformen ("The Municipality Reform" of 2007).  It was merged with Gjern, Kjellerup, and Silkeborg municipalities to form the new Silkeborg municipality.   This created a municipality with an area of 857 km2 and a total population of 84,167 (2005).  The new municipality belongs to Region Midtjylland ("Mid-Jutland Region").

External links 
 Silkeborg municipality's official website (Danish only)

References  
 Municipal statistics: NetBorger Kommunefakta, delivered from KMD aka Kommunedata (Municipal Data)
 Municipal mergers and neighbors: Eniro new municipalities map

Former municipalities of Denmark